Subhuman means "less than human". It may refer to:


Biology
 Any of the extinct members of the clade Hominina other than Homo or alternatively just Homo sapiens sapiens

Music

Bands and labels
 Subhumans (British band), a British punk rock band
 Subhumans (Canadian band), a Canadian punk rock band
 SubHuman : Human Imprint, an American record label founded by Dieselboy and Steve Gordon

Albums
 SubHuman, a 2007 album by Recoil

Songs
 "Subhuman" (song), a song by Garbage
 "Subhuman/Something Came Over Me", a song by Throbbing Gristle
 "Subhuman", a song by Blue Öyster Cult from the album Secret Treaties
 "Subhuman", a song by The Pillows from the album Another Morning, Another Pillows
 “Subhuman Species Gestating and Evolving In The Scum”, a song by Earthworm Von Doom from the album 8279

Other uses
 Dehumanization, the denial of full humanness in others and the cruelty and suffering that accompanies it
 Humanoid, a non-human creature or being with human form or characteristics
 Infrahumanisation, the tacitly held belief that one's ingroup is more human than an outgroup, which is less human
 Last man, the antithesis to the Übermensch in Nietzschean philosophy
 A measure of progress in artificial intelligence, denoting worse performance than most humans
 Second-class citizen, a person who is systematically discriminated against within a state or other political jurisdiction, despite their nominal status as a citizen or legal resident there
 Slave, someone forbidden to quit their service for another person and is treated as property
 Untermensch, a term from early eugenics and Nazi racial ideology for an "inferior human being"

See also
 Superhuman (disambiguation)